, marketed as  and also unofficially known as  is a domestic airport located  south southeast of the city of Wajima on the Noto Peninsula of Ishikawa Prefecture, Japan.

The airport is a four-story building with two jetways. It is officially designated a third class airport.

History 
Completed on July 7, 2003, Noto Airport is among Japan's newest greenfield airports not constructed to replace an existing facility. Initially, All Nippon Airways (ANA) was only willing to operate one flight per day. Ishikawa Prefecture thus suggested Japan's first occupancy guarantee agreement (搭乗率保証制度), in which ANA agreed to operate two daily flights and in exchange Ishikawa Prefecture agreed to compensate ANA if occupancy fell below a set target (initially 70%) and gross ticket sales were under 200 million yen. However, the agreement also specified that if the target is exceeded, ANA must pay the excess back to Ishikawa Prefecture. So far, the agreement seems to have been mutually beneficial:

Airlines and destinations

References

External links 
 Noto Airport

Airports in Japan
Transport in Ishikawa Prefecture
Buildings and structures in Ishikawa Prefecture
Wajima, Ishikawa
2003 establishments in Japan
Airports established in 2003